Chestnut Grove may refer to:

in England
Chestnut Grove School (London)

in the United States
(by state)
 Chestnut Grove School (Athens, Georgia), listed on the NRHP in Georgia
 Chestnut Grove (Glendale, Kentucky), listed on the NRHP in Kentucky
Chestnut Grove, North Carolina
 Chestnut Grove, Tennessee
Chestnut Grove, Albemarle County, Virginia
Chestnut Grove, Buckingham County, Virginia
Chestnut Grove, Lancaster County, Virginia
Chestnut Grove (plantation), New Kent County, Virginia, birthplace of Martha Washington